John Andrew Davis (born July 20, 1954) is an American film producer and founder of Davis Entertainment.

Background
Davis was born and raised in Denver, Colorado. He is the son of Barbara Davis (née Levine), a philanthropist, and former 20th Century Fox owner and oil and media industrialist Marvin Davis (1925–2004). His interest in cinema began as a youth when his father purchased the neighborhood film theater, where he sold popcorn and subsequently viewed up to 300 films a year. Davis graduated from Bowdoin College, attended Amherst College and received an M.B.A. from the Harvard Business School. Davis is of Jewish descent.

Career 
Davis, Chairman of Los Angeles-based Davis Entertainment, is one of the most prolific producers in the history of film. Having made more than 116 feature films and movies for television, 13 television series, which have earned more than $8 billion worldwide.

Davis Entertainment produces projects for all major studios, broadcast networks and streaming companies.

Davis has recently produced Jungle Cruise with Dwayne Johnson and Emily Blunt, and the movie Prey, which is the most watched television series or movie in Hulu history. Davis is also in post-production on The Uglies at Netflix with his wife Jordan Davis, as well as Harold and the Purple Crayon for Sony Pictures. He has also recently produced Dolemite Is My Name with Eddie Murphy for Netflix – his fifth movie with Eddie Murphy in their 25-year collaboration, which was nominated for best comedy at the Golden Globes and won Critics Choice Award for Best Comedy, Outstanding Independent Motion Picture at the NCAAP Image Awards, and was one of the 10 Times Magazine best movies of 2019. He also made the comedy hit Game Night for Warner Bros.

Past movies produced by Davis include the Predator franchise with Arnold Schwarzenegger, Grumpy Old Men and Grumpier Old Men with Walter Matthau and Jack Lennon, The Firm with Tom Cruise, Courage Under Fire with Denzel Washington, I, Robot with Will Smith, Waterworld with Kevin Costner, the hit micro-budget movie Chronicle, and Dr. Dolittle and Dr. Dolittle 2 with Eddie Murphy. 

Other Davis movies include a sequel to Shaft that included the return of both Samuel L. Jackson and Richard Roundtree; the Academy Award-Nominated animated Ferdinand, directed by Carlos Saldanha; five time Oscar-nominated director David O. Russell's biographical comedy-drama Joy (2015), starring Jennifer Lawrence, Robert De Niro, and Bradley Cooper, for 20th Century Fox; a big screen version of the 1960s TV series The Man from U.N.C.L.E., starring Henry Cavill and Armie Hammer, for Warner Bros.; Victor Frankenstein, a re-imagining of the horror classic Frankenstein, starring Daniel Radcliffe and James McAvoy for Fox; the sci-fi thriller I, Robot, starring Will Smith; the Jim Carrey starrer Mr. Popper's Penguins; Norbit, a comedy starring Eddie Murphy for DreamWorks/Paramount Pictures; the blockbuster The Firm, starring Tom Cruise; ; the Garfield franchise series voiced by Bill Murray for Fox; Waterworld, starring Kevin Costner; the Eddie Murphy comedy Daddy Day Care; Predator, starring Arnold Schwarzenegger; the Jack Lemmon/Walter Matthau trilogy Out to Sea, Grumpy Old Men, and Grumpier Old Men; Behind Enemy Lines, starring Owen Wilson and Gene Hackman; Predator 2, John Woo's Paycheck, starring Ben Affleck and Uma Thurman, for Paramount Pictures; and Alien vs. Predator, an action thriller combining the two iconic cinematic aliens, among many others.

New television projects include a pilot based on the Witch Mountain film franchise starring Bryce Dallas Howard which is set to premiere on Disney+ in 2023. Currently Davis Entertainment has four series on the air - The Blacklist on year ten, the CBS hit series The Equalizer with Queen Latifah, Magnum P.I. with Jay Hernandez, and the comedy series Blockbuster at Netflix.

Past Davis Entertainment television series include the NBC hour long drama The Blacklist, a Sony Television production, as well as NBC's action drama Timeless, ABC's hit comedies Dr. Ken starring Ken Jeong and Alex, Inc. starring Zach Braff and Michael Imperioli.

Davis was honored as The Hollywood Reporter’s Producer of the Year in 2015 and ShoWest’s Producer of the Year in 2004. He also won two People’s Choice Awards, for The Firm and Grumpy Old Men, and his films have received several Academy Award nominations. He also won the Critics Choice Award for best comedy for Dolemite Is My Name.

Other projects 
Apart from his entertainment career, Davis’ successful business ventures include Wetzel's Pretzels and casual pizza franchise Blaze Pizza. His newest food ventures include Dave’s Hot Chicken, the fastest-growing food company in America and PopUp Bagels, which was named twice the winner of the Brooklyn bagel fest for the best bagel in New York.

Davis has also owned, operated and started several small market television stations.

Personal life 
Davis is married to Jordan Davis. They have three children: Jack, Catherine, and Jensen, as mentioned in the Garfield: The Movie DVD commentary. Davis's three children said that the CG version of Garfield looked "evil" when they first saw him.

Filmography
He was a producer in all films unless otherwise noted.

Feature films

Direct-to-video

TV series

TV movies

References

External links

1954 births
Living people
Businesspeople from Denver
American film producers
American people of British-Jewish descent
Bowdoin College alumni
Harvard Business School alumni
Amherst College alumni
Davis family